Ähtäri is a town and municipality of Finland. It is located in the South Ostrobothnia region.

The municipality is unilingual Finnish.

Ähtäri is known for its zoo and hotel Mesikämmen designed by Timo and Tuomo Suomalainen which is partly built within bedrock. The biggest lake in the area is Ähtärinjärvi. There is also a relatively old and small board mill called Vääräkosken Pahvi in Ähtäri.

The largest private sector employers are Inhan Tehtaat, Silver-Veneet, Tankki, and Muovilami.

Notable people
 Anton Collin, cross country skier and road cyclist
 Eero Hiironen, sculptor and painter
 Kari Hirvonen, lead singer of Tango King
 Aki Hintsa, sports physician and orthopedic surgeon
 Toivo Korpela, preacher and speaker; fervent Laestadian and founder of the Korpela movement
 Niko Korsumäki, Snowcrossing World Championship bronze medalist
 Esa Latva-Äijö, actor
 Veikko Mattila, Member of Parliament
 Matti Pekkanen, engineer and politician
 Emanuel Pohjaväre, Member of Parliament
 Mikko Savola, Member of Parliament
 Topi Sorsakoski, musician
 Antti Tammilehto, musician
 Seppo Tammilehto, musician
 Edvard Valpas-Hänninen, former chairman of the Social Democratic Party of Finland

Notable groups
 Noumena, melodic death metal band

See also
 Finnish national road 58

References

External links
 
 Municipality of Ähtäri – Official website

 
Cities and towns in Finland
Populated places established in 1867